Cerithiopsis greenii is a species of sea snail, a gastropod in the family Cerithiopsidae, which is known from the Caribbean Sea, Gulf of Mexico, Gulf of Maine, and the northwestern Atlantic Ocean. It was described by C.B. Adams in 1839.

Description 
The maximum recorded shell length is 4.6 mm.

Habitat 
This species lives in marine environments. The minimum recorded depth for this species is 0 m; maximum recorded depth is 75 m.

References

greenii
Gastropods described in 1839